Konstantin Georgiyevich Shabanov (born November 17, 1989 in Pskov) is a Russian track and field athlete who specialises in the 110 metres hurdles. He was the gold medallist in the event at the 2008 World Junior Championships in Athletics and represented his country at the 2012 Summer Olympics.

He is coached by his father, Georgiy Shabanov, who won medals as a Soviet hurdler at the European Athletics Junior Championships and the Universiade.

International competitions

References

External links 

1989 births
Living people
Sportspeople from Pskov
Russian male hurdlers
Olympic male hurdlers
Olympic athletes of Russia
Athletes (track and field) at the 2012 Summer Olympics
Universiade medalists in athletics (track and field)
Universiade silver medalists for Russia
Medalists at the 2013 Summer Universiade
Medalists at the 2015 Summer Universiade
World Athletics Championships athletes for Russia
World Athletics U20 Championships winners
Russian Athletics Championships winners